Giannis Gotsoulias (born 15 March 1990) is a Greek professional footballer who plays as a defensive midfielder for Ilioupoli.

Club career
Born in Patras, Greece, Giannis made his senior debut with Panegialios and had the contract with the club until 2016. On 7 September 2016, he joined Panegialios. He profoundly played for Greek clubs.

Initially signed by the Greek club Diagoras Vrachneikon, he had no appearance for the senior squad and followed a transfer to Panegialios in 2010 He played 7 years at the Gamma Ethniki club securing a marvelous 91 appearances netting the ball twice in this era.  . He then signed a contract of one year with Greek club playing for Ergotelis and remained for the club until 2017. At this phase of his life he first appeared Super League 2 but secured no senior appearances for the club. In the mid of 2017 .Gotsoulias signed a year spell with the Gamma Ethniki side Paniliakos. From 2018 he is at Ionikos acting as the skipper of the side playing in Football League an dhas smashed the ball one into the nets against Aiolikos.

He has featured in various famous competitions namely  Greek Football Cup or Kypello Elladas (Greek), Gamma Ethniki, Super League 2 and Football League.

Career statistics

Honours
Ionikos
Super League Greece 2: 2020–21

References

1990 births
Living people
Greek footballers
Association football defenders
Panegialios F.C. players
Football League (Greece) players
Gamma Ethniki players
Super League Greece 2 players
Ergotelis F.C. players
Paniliakos F.C. players
Ionikos F.C. players
Footballers from Patras